Agustín Ale Perego (born 19 February 1995) is a Uruguayan professional footballer who plays as a centre-back for Primera División Paraguaya team Olimpia Asunción.

Club career
A youth academy product of River Plate, Ale made his professional debut on 23 November 2014 in a 2–0 league win against Racing Club. He scored his professional goal on 16 October 2016 in a 2–1 league win against Plaza Colonia.

On 17 January 2020, Ecuadorian club Delfín announced the signing of Ale on a season long loan deal with an option to buy.

International career
Ale is a former Uruguay youth international and was part of under-20 team which finished third at 2015 South American U-20 Championship. He was also included in squad which participated at 2015 FIFA U-20 World Cup, but didn't play any matches.

Career statistics

Club

External links
 Profile at Footballdatabase

References

1995 births
Living people
People from Las Piedras, Uruguay
Uruguayan footballers
Uruguay under-20 international footballers
Association football defenders
Uruguayan Primera División players
Club Atlético River Plate (Montevideo) players
2015 South American Youth Football Championship players